Mehbooba Mufti (born 22 May 1959) is an Indian politician of the  PDP, who served as the 9th and last Chief Minister of Jammu and Kashmir from 4 April 2016 to 19 June 2018. She was the first Female CM of J&K. After the revocation of the special status (autonomy) of the state in August 2019, Mufti was detained without any charges at first and later under the Jammu and Kashmir Public Safety Act.  She was released only in October 2020, after the Supreme Court of India quizzed the government about the length of her detention.

Mufti was the first woman to hold the office of Chief Minister in the J&K. She formed a coalition government in Jammu and Kashmir jointly with the Bharatiya Janta Party (BJP). She resigned in June 2018 after the BJP withdrew from the coalition.

Mufti was the president of the PDP and was a member of the Indian parliament, representing Anantnag in the 16th Lok Sabha; before she was sworn in as the Chief Minister of J&K. She also represented Anantnag in the 14th Lok Sabha (2004–09).

Early life

She is the daughter of Mufti Mohammad Sayeed and Gulshan Ara, born in 1959 in Akhran Nowpora, J&K, India. She graduated in English literature from Government College for Women in Jammu, and has a law degree from the University of Kashmir. Post 1989, she shifted to N. Delhi and joined the Bombay Mercantile Bank, after which she worked with East West Airlines, before moving back to J&K.  Her ex-husband is a political analyst, an animal-rights activist, and was briefly with National Conference party. She has two daughters, Iltija and Irtiqa.

Political career
When elections for the state assembly were held in 1996, Mehbooba became one of the most popular members elected from Bijbehara on an Indian National Congress ticket. Her father had returned to the Congress, which he had left in 1987, angry at the alliance that party had formed with its traditional rival in the state, the National Conference. She later served as the leader of the opposition in the assembly, taking on the government of chief minister Farooq Abdullah with asperity.

She resigned her assembly seat and went on to contest the parliamentary elections in 1999 from Srinagar, where she lost to incumbent member Omar Abdullah. She won the Pahalgam seat in the state assembly from South Kashmir, defeating Rafi Ahmed Mir, when assembly elections were held again in 2002. She was elected to the Lok Sabha from Anantnag seat in 2004 and 2014. She defeated Mirza Mehboob Beg who was the incumbent MP in 2014 Lok Sabha Elections.

After her father's death in January 2016, when he was heading the coalition government in Jammu and Kashmir, she took forward the same alliance with Bhartiya Janata Party (BJP), the second time the BJP and the PDP formed a government in Jammu and Kashmir. On 4 April 2016, she took the oath and became the first woman Chief Minister of Jammu and Kashmir.

On 25 June 2016, she won an Assembly seat in a by-election in Anantnag with the highest margin in any recent elections there and thereafter focussed on settling of Rohingyas.

On 19 June 2018, she resigned as chief minister of Kashmir. Her government had been an alliance between the Peoples' Democratic Party (PDP) and the BJP, but there was a rift in the alliance in February 2018, when two BJP ministers expressed public support for a man who was alleged to have raped and killed an eight-year-old girl in Kathua District.  The BJP's National General Secretary, Ram Madhav, announced the end of the alliance between the BJP and the PDP, and said that it was because of the deteriorating security situation. Mehbooba and the state government had tried suspending security operations for Ramadan, but the militants had not reciprocated, and 30 people were killed during the ceasefire. So the BJP withdrew from the alliance with the PDP so that the Indian government could get tough with the militants. When the alliance between the PDP and the BJP ended, Mehbooba resigned as chief minister. Mehbooba said "the muscular policy will not work in Kashmir".

She again contested 2019 Lok Sabha elections from Anantnag seat but lost it to Hasnain Masoodi of National Conference.

Detention 
On 5 August 2019, she was detained by the Central government. Her daughter Iltija Mufti took over her mother's Twitter account on the 46th day of detention. In November, Iltija Mufti wrote a letter to the Srinagar Deputy Commissioner to shift her mother to a place better equipped for the valley's winter.

In February 2020 she was further detained under the Jammu and Kashmir Public Safety Act. She was released on 13 October 2020.

25 Nov 2020, Former Jammu and Kashmir chief minister and Peoples Democratic Party chief Mehbooba Mufti was detained by Jammu and Kashmir Police and was not allowed to visit South Kashmir's Pulwama to meet the family of senior PDP leader Waheed Parra, who was arrested by the National Investigating Agency earlier that week.

Mufti said that her daughter Iltija Mufti has also been placed under house arrest.

Mufti & 7 other former politicians were asked to leave the government quarters by the Jammu and Kashmir administration on 27 Nov 2022.

See also 

 Mehbooba Mufti ministry (2016–2018)

References

External links

 Official biographical sketch in Parliament of India website
 State Assembly hall security remove opposition People's Democratic Party
  ("Buffeted by Insurgency and Dissent within Her Party, She Needs All the Help She Can Get from a Reluctant Centre.") indiatoday.intoday.on 4 May 2017

|-

|-

1959 births
Living people
University of Kashmir alumni
India MPs 2004–2009
Women in Jammu and Kashmir politics
Women chief ministers of Indian states
People from Anantnag district
Jammu and Kashmir Peoples Democratic Party politicians
Indian National Congress politicians from Jammu and Kashmir
People from Bijbehara
Lok Sabha members from Jammu and Kashmir
India MPs 2014–2019
Kashmiri people
Chief Ministers of Jammu and Kashmir
Chief ministers from Peoples Democratic Party
20th-century Indian women politicians
20th-century Indian politicians
21st-century Indian women politicians
21st-century Indian politicians
Women members of the Lok Sabha